Fort Arbuckle may refer to:
Fort Arbuckle (Oklahoma) in Garvin County, Oklahoma
Fort Arbuckle (Florida)
Old Fort Arbuckle in Tulsa County, Oklahoma